Hibernia was a steam locomotive designed by Richard Roberts and built by Sharp, Roberts and Company in 1834 for the Dublin and Kingstown Railway (D&KR). The locomotive had vertical cylinders driving via bell cranks.

History

Procurement
The D&KR left it until August 1833 before inviting nine firms to tender for 6 identical engines to enable part swapping to be delivered by 1 May 1834, the seven firms replying indicating timescales were short given the infancy of locomotive engineering with manufacturers on a steep learning curve.  The D&KR engaged John Urpeth Rastrick who had been judge at the 1830 Rainhill Trials to visit the manufacturers.  Rastrick visited six as well as the L&MR works and delivered to board a specification which strongly matched the L&MR No. 32 Experiment from Sharp, Roberts and Co.  D&KR's Bergin visited the  L&MR and expressed concerns over Experiment's unique features, vibrations and fuel consumption.  The D&KR's consultant engineer Charles Blacker Vignoles was particularly concerned with the vertical mounting of the cylinders.  A D&KR committee then re-worded the specification to give firms more opportunity to submit their preferred design.

With time running short the D&KR were forced to order from suppliers most likely to be able to deliver within the required timescale.  They eventually order three from Sharp, Roberts and Co., the first of which would be Hibernia, the other two being Britannia and Manchester.  Three were also ordered from George Forrester and Company's Vauxhall foundry at Liverpool based on their Swiftsure locomotive that were to become Vauxhall, Dublin and Kingstown.

Hibernia was completed in 1834 and was to be followed by her class sisters .  Power transmission from the vertical cylinders was via bell cranks.

For delivery Hibernia made her way from the Manufacture at Manchester to Liverpool under her own steam. She was transported by the City of Dublin Steam Packet Company at a cost of £21 plus for £7/10/- for the tender with Forresters' Vauxhall on the same sailing.  At Dublin they were taken through the streets on a temporary "portable railway" before 50 men hauled them up to rail level at Westland Row.

Trials
The L&MR permitted the locomotives to be tested on their line before being shipped to Ireland.  In Ireland an "engine hospital" had been set up at Serpentine avenue to allow for their maintenance.

on 9 October 1834 Hibernia hauled a train of eight carriages which was the first to traverse the complete length of the line carrying members of the public.  While this was the first trial to traverse the length of the line from Westland Row to Salthill the locomotive Vauxhall had done a shorter trial run with a small train from Dublin to the Martello Tower at Williamstown which is now part of Blackrock Park.

Operations
Lyons suggests the issue may have been the use of piston valves rather than the bell crank transmission. The vertical cylinders caused considerable pounding resulting in damage to the locomotives axles and springs; significant damage was also caused to the track with rail fractures and subsidence being noted.

Hibernia was withdrawn after blowing up at Kingstown in 1842.  The two sister engines Britannia and Manchester were also withdrawn.

Model
An O Gauge model of Hibernia built by Cyril Fry exists in the Fry Model Collection along with examples of its associated carriages.

Notes

References

External links
Picture of Hibernia at Science & Society

2-2-0 locomotives
Early steam locomotives
Individual locomotives of Ireland
Steam locomotives of Ireland
Sharp Stewart locomotives
Scrapped locomotives
5 ft 3 in gauge locomotives
Standard gauge steam locomotives
Railway locomotives introduced in 1834
Standard gauge locomotives of Ireland